Adela Amalia Noriega Méndez (born October 24, 1969), better known as Adela Noriega (Spanish pronunciation: [aˈðela noɾˈjeɣa]), is a Mexican actress.

The following is a list of awards and nominations received by Noriega. The list is incomplete.

Awards and nominations

New York Latin ACE Awards

Bravo Awards

Sol de Oro Awards 
Sol de Oro is awarded by the Mexico's National Association of Journalists.

Laurel de Oro Awards

TVyNovelas Awards (Mexico)

TVyNovelas Awards (Colombia)

Palmas de Oro Awards

Eres Awards

Califa de Oro Awards

El Heraldo de México Awards

INTE Awards

FAMA Awards

References 

Lists of awards received by actor